The Tainan Municipal Xinying Stadium serves as a multi-purpose stadium, but is mostly used for athletic events. It was opened in Tainan, Taiwan, in 1998, and has a seating capacity of 30,000 people.

See also
 List of stadiums in Taiwan

References

External links
Official site

Football venues in Taiwan
Multi-purpose stadiums in Taiwan
Buildings and structures in Tainan